is a Japanese  weightlifter. His best result was the bronze medal at the 2012 Junior Asian Championship in Yangon.

Career
He competed in the men's 105 kg event at the 2014 Asian Games where he finished ninth place. At the 2017 Asian Weightlifting Championships he won the bronze medal in the 105 kg snatch category, at the overall he finished fourth place.

Major results

References

External links
 

1993 births
Living people
Weightlifters at the 2014 Asian Games
Japanese male weightlifters
Asian Games competitors for Japan
21st-century Japanese people